Ismat Makhmudovich Khushev (Uzbek: Ismat Xushev; Russian: Исмат Хушев; born 20 June 1958) is an author, politician, journalist, and a political analyst from Uzbekistan. He is a former member of the Uzbek Parliament and a cabinet member of former Uzbek President Islam A. Karimov.

On June 26, 2021 Khushev was officially inducted into the Writers’ Union of Uzbekistan.

Personal life
Khushev was born on June 20, 1958 in the town of Kitab in the Qashqadaryo Region, Uzbekistan.

He's married and has four children. He was educated in Moscow State University and Tashkent State University at the Department of Journalism.

After being arrested 3 times due to allegedly being involved in a coup d'état after opposing Karimov, Khushev fled to Moscow, Russia, and then sought permanent residence in Canada.

Khushev is the founder and chief editor of the Uzbek & Russian newspaper Dunyo Uzbeklari, electronically published from Toronto, Canada.

See also
 Jahangir Mamatov

References

Living people
Uzbekistani journalists
1958 births
Moscow State University alumni
National University of Uzbekistan alumni